John W. Smith House, also known as the Roberta Nicholson House, is a historic home located at Rochester, Fulton County, Indiana.  It was built in 1892, and is a -story, Neo-Jacobean style frame dwelling on a limestone block foundation. It features a projecting round tower, wraparound porch, and 75 windows of various sizes.

It was listed on the National Register of Historic Places in 1979.

References

Houses on the National Register of Historic Places in Indiana
Jacobean architecture in the United States
Houses completed in 1892
Buildings and structures in Fulton County, Indiana
National Register of Historic Places in Fulton County, Indiana
1892 establishments in Indiana